Stacey Bertrand Dillard (born September 17, 1968) is a former American football player who played defensive lineman in the National Football League (NFL). Dillard attended Clarksville High School in Clarksville, Texas playing for coach Hilton Lambeth. After playing college football for the Oklahoma Sooners, Dillard was drafted by the New York Giants in the sixth round (153rd overall) of the 1992 NFL Draft. He played his entire career for the Giants (1992–1995).

Dillard is the athletic director and former head football coach at Princeton High School in Princeton, Texas.

References

1968 births
Living people
American football defensive linemen
New York Giants players
Oklahoma Sooners football players
High school football coaches in Texas
People from Clarksville, Texas
Players of American football from Texas